The 2014–2016 ICC Women's Championship was the first edition of the ICC Women's Championship, a women's One Day International cricket (WODI) competition contested by eight teams. The top four teams at the conclusion of the tournament (Australia, England, New Zealand and West Indies) gained automatically qualification for the 2017 World Cup. The bottom four teams (India, South Africa, Pakistan and Sri Lanka) faced six qualifying teams in the 2017 World Cup Qualifier for the remaining four places at the World Cup. When four or more WODIs were played in a series, only three pre-selected matches were included in the championship. The second edition of the competition started in October 2017.

Teams
The following teams played in the tournament:

Results

The breakdown of results was as follows. During each round, each team played against their opponent three times.

Note: The round six fixtures between Pakistan and India should have taken place by the end of October 2016. As of 9 November 2016, no decision was reached regarding the fixtures going ahead or not. On 23 November 2016 the ICC Technical Committee ruled that India's Women's team had forfeited all of the matches, with the points being awarded to Pakistan. Pakistan were awarded two points for each game, with India considered to have scored 0 runs in the 50 overs of each game, with their net run rate adjusted to reflect this.

Points table

* Round 6 matches were awarded to Pakistan (see Note on ).

Statistics

Most runs

Most wickets

References

External links
 Series Home at ESPN Cricinfo

  
ICC Women's Championship
International cricket competitions in 2014
International cricket competitions in 2014–15
International cricket competitions in 2015
International cricket competitions in 2015–16
International cricket competitions in 2016
International cricket competitions in 2016–17
2014 in women's cricket
2015 in women's cricket
2016 in women's cricket